Rajshahi Cadet College, or RCC, is a military high school, located in Sardah, Rajshahi, Bangladesh. It is situated by the bank of river Padma at Mukhtarpur village of Sardah in Charghat of Rajshahi District of the northern region of Bangladesh.

History
The college, the foundation stone of which was laid by the then President of Pakistan, Field Marshal Ayub Khan, on 6 November 1964, was formally inaugurated on 11 February 1966 as Ayub Cadet College. East Pakistan Governor Munaim Khan inaugurated the college.

It was renamed soon after the independence of Bangladesh to Rajshahi Cadet College (RCC).

Late Wing Commander Mohammad Syed, a retired member of the Pakistan Air Force was the founding Principal of the college, joining on 1 November 1965. The first Adjutant to join was Captain Khaled Adib on 2 February 1968. Mr. M Saleh Uddin Sinha joined as the first teacher of the college.

It was the last among the four cadet colleges established in East Pakistan. The first Bengali Principal of the college appointed on 1 January 1970 was Mr. M. Bakiatullah, the third principal. 

Eight cadets and ten staff of the college died in combat, while four remain missing.

The first Bengali Adjutant of the college, was Capt. MA Rashid (FF), the third adjuntant, who joined on 23 September 1970. 

Captain and later Colonel Rashid Bir Bikram was given the death penalty in the coup that killed President Ziaur Rahman Bir Uttam at Chittagong in 1981. He encouraged cadets to join the Bangladesh independence war in 1971. 

The college founding day is celebrated every year on 11 February.

Infrastructure

Sports facilities
Rajshahi Cadet College has six basketball courts, a tennis complex, five football grounds and several volleyball courts, a golf course, a hockey field, a squash complex, a swimming complex with all modern facilities, a well-equipped gymnasium, and a perfect mile test track with proper lighting for both day and nighttime exercises.

Old Rajshahi Cadets Association

The alumni association of the college is known as the Old Rajshahi Cadets Association (ORCA) or Old Sardah Cadets Association (OSCA). It was created in 1972 to allow for the maintenance of relationships between former cadets.

The first constitution was adopted on 1 October 1973 and the logo was designed by Muhammad Ehsanullah. AKM Saiful Majid was selected/elected as the founder Vice-President of the Association. Shortly thereafter as he left the country, M Sadirul Islam took over the reins.

During that time and subsequent periods, the incumbent Principal of Rajshahi Cadet College was designated as the ex officio President of OSCA/ORCA. Therefore, the late M. Bakiatullah was the first President of OSCA/ORCA.

Houses

Notable alumni

Lieutenant general Aminul Karim former Military Secretary to the President of Bangladesh, Iajuddin Ahmed.
Lieutenant general Abdul Hafiz former Chief of General Staff, Bangladesh Army.
Mrinal Haque: sculptor
Mohammed Sufiur Rahman: former director, South Asian Association Regional Cooperation Secretariat, now ambassador of Bangladesh to Australia
Enamul Karim Nirjhar: Bangladeshi architect and filmmaker
M. Saif Islam: Bangladeshi-American professor of Electrical and Computer Engineering at the University of California, Davis
Retired Major General Jahangir Kabir Talukdar: former commandant, Bangladesh Military Academy & former ambassador of Bangladesh in Kenya
Rana Mohammad Sohel: Politician and the incumbent Member of Parliament of Nilphamari-3.

Gallery

References

External links

 http://orca.org.bd/
 website maintained by Bangladesh Army

Rajshahi
1966 establishments in East Pakistan
Cadet colleges in Bangladesh
Organisations based in Rajshahi
Educational Institutions affiliated with Bangladesh Army
Educational institutions established in 1966